Gus Raymond Alborn (born December 23, 1938) is a former American football player and coach. He served as head football coach at Rice University from 1978 to 1983 and at Lamar University from 1986 to 1989, compiling a career college football record of 26–83.

While coaching at his alma mater, Rice, Alborn compiled a 13–53 record overall.  He was fired after the 1983 season and soon after became defensive line coach for the Houston Gamblers of the United States Football League (USFL).  In 1986, Alborn was hired as head coach at Lamar University in Beaumont, Texas. He was released from his contract in 1990 when Lamar chose to discontinue the school's football program.  Alborn  later served as head coach at Lamar Consolidated High School before retiring in 2002.

On March 2, 2010, Alborn was elected mayor of Ruidoso, New Mexico.

Head coaching record

College

References

1938 births
Living people
American football defensive tackles
Lamar Cardinals football coaches
Rice Owls football coaches
Rice Owls football players
United States Football League coaches
High school football coaches in Texas
Mayors of places in New Mexico
People from Ruidoso, New Mexico